Melvin H. Schlytter (October 22, 1890 – July 20, 1959) was a member of the Wisconsin State Assembly.

Schlytter was born Melvin Hjalmar Schlytter October 22, 1890 in Wittenberg, Wisconsin. He attended Lawrence University and served in the United States Army during World War I. Schlytter died on July 20, 1959, in Madison, Wisconsin.

Political career
Schlytter was a member of the Assembly from 1939 to 1940. Additionally, he was a member of the Shawano County, Wisconsin Board. He was a Republican.

References

People from Wittenberg, Wisconsin
County supervisors in Wisconsin
Republican Party members of the Wisconsin State Assembly
Military personnel from Wisconsin
United States Army soldiers
United States Army personnel of World War I
Lawrence University alumni
1890 births
1959 deaths
20th-century American politicians